Jason Goldwatch (born September 1, 1976) is an American music video director and commercial director who is a Co-Founder and Executive Creative Director of Decon, a creative agency and record label based in New York. He is best known for his work with Kid Cudi, Pharrell Williams, Linkin Park, Evidence, Action Bronson, and Dilated Peoples. Goldwatch has also partnered with The Alchemist for the experimental performance art group Media Muerte.

Background
Goldwatch was born in San Francisco, where he attended San Francisco School of the Arts before going to Cal Arts. He worked at several production companies (including Satellite Films, where he was recruited by Spike Jonze) before touring with Dilated Peoples as their videographer. In 2000, he partnered with Peter Bittenbender on One Big Trip, which led to their founding of Decon in 2002. One of the most recognizable aspects about the music videos by Goldwatch is that he credits himself at the beginning of each video. He has said it was a decision he made early on to help establish his personal brand and also because people were already misspelling his name.

Selected videography

Music videos
1994

 Swollen Members – “Paradise Lost”

1995

 Swollen Members – “Deep End”

1996

 Aceyalone – “I Think”

1998

 Kool Kieth – “Plastic World”

2000

 Hieroglyphics – “Soweto”

2002

 Linkin Park – “Enth E Nd”

2003

 Aceyalone – “Give It Here”

2006

 Loot Pack – “Whenimondamic”

2007

 Common and Sadat X feat. Talib Kweli – “1999”
 Jay Z – “Pray”

2008

 Aceyalone feat. Chali 2na and Bionikc- “Eazy”
 Dilated Peoples – “Worst Come To Worst”
 Dilated Peoples feat. Defari – “Third Degree”
 Evidence – “Mr. Slow Flow”
 Ludacris – “Blueberry Yum Yum” 

2009

 Busta Rhymes feat. Estelle – “World Go Round”
 Chali 2na ft. Beenie Man - “International” 
 Damian Marley - “One Loaf Of Bread”
 Dilated Peoples - “Work The Angels”
 Evidence - “For Whom The Bell Tolls”
 Kid Cudi - “Soundtrack 2 My Life”
 Plantlife – “Sumthin About Her”
 The Alchemist - “Smile”
 88 Keys feat. Kanye West - “Stay Up (Viagra)”

2010

 Evidence – “To Be Continued”
 Gangrene – “The Sickness”
 Jay Electronica – “Exhibit A”
 Jim Jones feat. Rell – “Blow Your Smoke”
 Just Blaze – “Exhibit A”
 Kid Cudi – “Cudderisback”
 Kid Cudi – “Erase Me”
 Kid Cudi – “Mojo So Dope”
 Ninjasonik – “Bars”
 The Roots – “Dear God 2.0” 

2011

 Jay Electronica – “Dimethyltryptamine”
 Nas – “Nasty”
 Pusha T feat. Tyler The Creator – “Trouble On My Mind”
 Pusha T – “What Dreams Are Made Of”
 Rakaa feat. Aloe Blacc – “Crown Of Thorns”
 The Alchemist feat. Danny Brown and Schoolboy Q – “Flight Confirmation”

2012

 Alexander Spit feat. Bago- “A Breathtaking Trip”
 Gangrene- “Vodka & Ayahuasca”
 Roc Marciano- “76”
 Travis Barker and Yelawolf- “Push Em”

2013

 Action Bronson – “Strictly For My Jeeps”
 Gangrene – “Take Drugs”
 Step Brothers – “Step Masters”
 The white Mandingos – “The Ghetto Is Tryna Kill Me”

2014

 Schoolboy Q – “Break The Bank”
 The Alchemist – “Shut The Fuck Up”

2015

 Gangrene feat. Action Bronson- “Driving Gloves”
 Gangrene feat. Sean Price and Havoc – “Sheet Music”
 Gangrene – “The Last Great Disgrace”
 Loudpvck – “Lit”

2016

 Code Cut Crew - Terrible Teddy
 Invisibl Skratch Piklz – “Fresh Out Of Fucks”
 Travis Barker And Yelawolf - Out Of Control

2017

 Blink 182 – “Home Is Such A Lonely Place”
 Evidence – “Jim Dean”

2018

 Alchemist feat. Earl Sweatshirt – “E Coli”
 Alchemist feat. Conway, Schoolboy Q and Westside Gun – “Fork In The Pot”
 Atmosphere – “Graffiti”
 Atmosphere – “Virgo”
 Cypress Hill feat. Sick Jacken – “Locos”
 Evidence feat. Slug – “Powder Cocaine”
 Everlast – “The Cull”
 J Critch and Harry Fraud – “Thousand Ways”
 Nas, Dave East, Lin Manuel Miranda and Aloe Blacc – “Hamilton”

2019

 Coolkids – “Dipped”
 Evidence – “The Factory”
 Everlast – “Dream State”
 Nas – “War Is Love”

2020

 Atmosphere – “The Day Before Halloween”

a.     “Where The Road Forks”

b.    “Space is Safe”

c.     “She Loves My Not”

d.    “The New People”

e.    “The Future Is Disgusting”

f.      “DoubleTown”

g.    “Stardust”

h.     “Blotter Acid Reflux Syndrome”

i.       “Party Crashers”

j.      “Sleep Apnea”

 Bam Marley – “Fight Your Fears”
 Boldy James and The Alchemist – “Slow Roll”
 Brother Ali – “Greatest That Never Lived”
 Conway The Machine and The Alchemist – “Calvin”
 Everlast – “Slow Your Roll”
 Roc Marciano – “Downtown 81”
 The Alchemist – “Blank Canvas”
 The Alchemist feat. Westside Gun – “Stained Glass”
 Travis Barker and Run The Jewels – “Forever”

2021

 B Real feat. Berner – “Number 9”
 Evidence – “Start The Day With A Beat”
 Kid Cudi – “Solo Dolo, Pt III”
 Nas – “40-16 Building”
 The Alchemist and Born x Raised – “Carry The Fire”
 Westside Gun feat. Freddie Gibbs and Roc Marciano – “$500 Ounces”

2022

 Action Bronson – “Spirit Crocodile”
 Roc Marciano and The Alchemist feat. Ice T - “ The Horns of Abraxas”
 The Alchemist –“ Cycles”

Commercials
Square Space with Eric Ripert
Patron mixology with Chef Marcus
Converse "Chuck Test"
Google Glass campaign 
Microsoft Zune campaign
Teva - "The Naturist" and "Teva Life Agents"
Sony Ericsson - "Girl What's Up?"
Shakira - "She Wolf" online video campaign
Kübler Absinthe online campaign
Eminem - "Relapse" web shorts

Feature length
"Break Through" with FUTURA 2000 and Spriteiuop4
"Time Alone"
”A Billion Bucks” (2010) – Documentary about Young Buck
Forthcoming Jay Electronica Documentary (2010)
"A Million in the Morning" (2010)
"Dilated Peoples: The Release Party" (2007)
"Ice Cream: Vol. 1" (2006)
”Revenge of the Robots” (2003) – Def Jux documentary
"The Journey of Mr. Rager" (2010) - Documentary about Kid Cudi

References

1976 births
Advertising directors
American music video directors
California Institute of the Arts alumni
Living people
American filmmakers